Montes Oscuros (Spanish for "dark mountains") is a small mountain range located between the Sierra de Cayey and the main Cordillera Central, on the municipalities of Coamo and Salinas in southern Puerto Rico. The mountain range and its environment are protected from urban development through a conservation easement (servidumbre de conservación), designated as the Montes Oscuros Scenic Easement (Spanish: Servidumbre Escénica Montes Oscuros).

The range rises to elevations of 2,047 feet (624 m) in elevation at Piedras Chiquitas, sometimes referred to as Los Farallones. Other mountain peaks of the range include Cerro Cariblanco, Cerro Pío Juan, Cerro Respaldo and Cerro Modesto.

See also 
 Protected areas of Puerto Rico

References 

Mountain ranges of Puerto Rico
Protected areas of Puerto Rico
Coamo, Puerto Rico
Salinas, Puerto Rico